Johann Baptist Klerr (15 July 1830 – 27 September 1875) was an Austrian Kapellmeister and composer.

Life 
Born in Baden bei Wien, Klerr was the younger brother of Ludwig Klerr. From 1856 he worked as a conductor at the Sopron theatre and occasionally worked there with his brother Ludwig.

The next stages were Wiener Neustadt, Baden and after a short guest performance in 1858 in Kraków, Klerr was signed on in Budapest. In 1862 he was engaged as Kapellmeister at the Carltheater in Vienna and worked there until 1867 among others also with Franz von Suppé.

In 1867 Klerr moved to the Theater an der Wien, also as Kapellmeister. Between 1868 and 1872 and again from 1874 to 1875 Klerr brought together the venues of Baden and Wiener Neustadt as musical director.

Klerr died at the age of 45 in Baden, where he also found his final resting place.

Work 
 Die Nixe, Opera.
 Die schöne Müllerin, Opera.
 Der Gang nach dem Eisenhammer (music to the ballad of the same name by Friedrich Schiller).
 Der kleine Josi : komisches Singspiel in einem Akte.

Further reading 
 Peter Erhart: Niederösterreichische Komponisten. Verlag Doblinger, Vienna 1998, .

External links

References 

Austrian composers
19th-century classical composers
1830 births
1875 deaths
Musicians from Baden bei Wien